The McCallie School is a boys college-preparatory school located on Missionary Ridge in Chattanooga, Tennessee, United States. The school was founded in 1905 and now has 250 boarding students in grades 9–12 and 669 day students in grades 6–12.

History

Brothers Spencer Jarnigan and James "Park" McCallie founded the school in 1905, which remained under the control of the family until a Board of Trustees assumed management of the school in 1937.

Founded as an all-boys school, McCallie became a military school in the wake of World War I, with students wearing uniforms and participating in military drills.

In 1970, McCallie dropped its military program as a result of admission challenges during the Vietnam era.

While the school's Board of Trustees agreed to allow the admission of African-American students beginning with day students in 1969 and boarding students in 1970, the school did not admit its first African-American student until 1971.

Academics
The school employs 140 full-time faculty members  and offers a college preparatory curriculum. The student-to-teacher ratio is 8:1, with an average class size of 14.

The school offers 19 Advanced Placement classes, as well as additional classes at levels beyond AP in math, science and English.

In addition to regular classes in English, math, science, history, foreign language, Bible and related courses, McCallie offers more than 20 music and arts classes, and students are required to take a certain number of arts and music classes to graduate.

Enrollment
McCallie's 6–12th grade student body consists of 936 students. Of these, approximately 250 are boarding students hailing from 22 different states and 10 foreign countries.  All boarding students are in grades 9–12. 268 Middle School day students comprise grades 6–8.

Rankings
McCallie was recognized as the top private high school in the state of Tennessee by Business Insider in 2016. In Niche's 2021 high school rankings, McCallie was ranked the number one boarding high school, while being ranked third of the four all-boys high schools in the state of Tennessee. Nationally, McCallie was ranked the 28th best overall all-boys high school, and 84th of 399 boarding schools.

Campus facilities

Athletics

McCallie fields 15 varsity sports teams and competes in the Tennessee Secondary School Athletic Association (TSSAA) in football, cross country, track and field, basketball, golf, bowling, tennis, wrestling, baseball, squash and soccer. In 2021, McCallie won state championships in tennis, cross-country, track and field and football. The school competes on the varsity level in non-TSSAA sports, including crew, lacrosse, swimming, diving, climbing and ultimate frisbee.

The baseball coach is former Major League Baseball player Tim Costo.

Finances
As of 2019, McCallie's endowment was approximately $141 million. In the 2019 fiscal year, the school's total revenue was $55,517,645.

Alumni
Notable alumni include:
Howard Baker Jr., 1943, former Senate Majority Leader, White House Chief of Staff, and Ambassador to Japan
 Michael Bingham, 2004, Olympic medalist in track and field
 Bill Brock, 1949, Former United States Senator
 Carroll A. Campbell, Jr., 1958, Former South Carolina governor
 James Rhyne Killian, former president of Massachusetts Institute of Technology
 Ralph McGill, 1917, Pulitzer Prize winner, anti-segregationist, and former editor of the Atlanta Constitution
 Jon Meacham, 1987, Pulitzer Prize winner, former editor of Newsweek, and contributing editor at Time
 Sonny Montgomery, 1939, former member of United States House of Representatives from Mississippi
 Pat Robertson, 1946, American media mogul, televangelist, political commentator, former Republican presidential candidate, and former Southern Baptist minister.
Sean Ryan, 2010, Olympic American Athlete (competed in 2016 Summer Olympics in Men's 10 km Open Water Swimming)
 Ted Turner, 1956, founder of CNN and Turner Broadcasting System, former owner of Atlanta Braves, Atlanta Hawks, Atlanta Thrashers
Zach Wamp, 1976, former member of the United States House of Representatives from Tennessee, former candidate for Governor of Tennessee. 
Marshall Fletcher McCallie, ambassador to Namibia from 1993 until 1996 under president Bill Clinton.

References

External links
 Official web site
 The Association of Boarding Schools profile

1905 establishments in Tennessee
Boarding schools in Tennessee
Educational institutions established in 1905
Preparatory schools in Tennessee
Private high schools in Tennessee
Private middle schools in Tennessee
Schools in Chattanooga, Tennessee